The Dumoulin Rocks are a group of rocks 4 nautical miles (7 km) northeast of Cape Leguillou, the northern tip of Tower Island, in the Palmer Archipelago. A study of air photos has shown that there are two groups of rocks. The southwest group has been named Kendall Rocks and the northeast group Dumoulin Rocks.

References 

Rock formations of the Palmer Archipelago